Hillcrest is a residential community in Broome County, New York in the town of Fenton, directly north of Binghamton. To the north of Hillcrest is the Chenango Bridge and the village of Port Dickinson
Hillcrest contains numerous single-family homes, a high school, two public parks, three churches, a public library, a cemetery, numerous industries and businesses, and a central plaza area within walking distance of most homes that includes a gas station, family-run Italian restaurant, ice cream parlor, diner, and Subway (restaurant). It lies in Broome County, and borders I-88 and the Chenango River.

Places of interest
Some places of interest for community members and visitors are:
 Chenango Valley High School- a local high school.
 Hillcrest youth baseball Field - site of a baseball and softball field.
 Bella Pizza - Family-owned pizza and Italian restaurant in the Hillcrest Heights Plaza, established 1983.
 Suzy Q's - Family-owned ice cream parlor in the Hillcrest Heights Plaza offering ice cream cones, shakes, and sundaes.
 Sunoco - Gas station and convenience store in the Hillcrest Heights Plaza.
 Fraternity - Family-owned Chinese take-out restaurant in the Hillcrest Heights Plaza.
 Laura's Luncheonette - Breakfast and lunch diner.
 Fenton Free Library - Community run library.
 Chenango Valley Cemetery
 NorthPointe Church - A Non-denominational church with modern worship emphasis, located on the East Service Road.
 St. Francis of Assisi - Catholic Church, former school, and gymnasium.
 Ogden Hillcrest UMC - United Methodist Church, and Thrift Shop
 Adaptive Driving School
 Stone Spillway, National Defense Stockpile Center - listed on the National Register of Historic Places in 2004.

References

Binghamton metropolitan area
Populated places in Broome County, New York
Hamlets in New York (state)